Sophisticated Boom Boom is the debut studio album by English pop band Dead or Alive, released in April 1984 by Epic Records. Featuring mostly synth-pop and dance elements, the album contains the band's first UK Top 40 single, a cover version of KC and the Sunshine Band's "That's the Way (I Like It)".  That song, along with "Misty Circles", were hits on the U.S. Hot Dance Music/Club Play chart. The album was a minor success in the UK where it peaked at No. 29.

The original cassette version of the album was released with three bonus tracks. In 2007, the album was re-released on CD by Cherry Red Records with seven bonus tracks.

The cover photograph was taken by Peter Ashworth and was inspired by the cover of Kate Bush's album Lionheart (1978).

The original title for the album was Mad, Bad and Dangerous to Know, but it was rejected by the label. It would later become the title of the band's third album.

Track listing

Personnel
Credits are adapted from the Sophisticated Boom Boom liner notes.

Dead or Alive
 Pete Burns – vocals
 Mike Percy – bass guitar
 Tim Lever – keyboards
 Steve Coy – drums
 Wayne Hussey – guitar (uncredited on album artwork)

Additional musicians
 Jackie Challenor – backing vocals
 Lorenza Johnson – backing vocals
 Mae McKenna – backing vocals
 Kick Horns – horns
 Caroline's Quartet – strings

Production and artwork
 Zeus B. Held – producer; mixer
 Dead or Alive – producer
 Tim Palmer – engineer; mixer
 Chris Sheldon – engineer
 Peter Ashworth – photography

References

External links
 

1984 debut albums
Dead or Alive (band) albums
Epic Records albums